The  2014 European Artistic Roller Skating Championships were held in Roccaraso, Italy from August 31 to September 5, 2014. Organized by European Confederation of Roller Skating.

Participating nations
10 nations entered the competition.

Medallists

References

External links 
 

European 2014
2014 in roller sports
2014 in Italian sport